Eugene Moore, Jr. (August 26, 1909 – March 12, 1978) was an American professional baseball right fielder. He played in Major League Baseball (MLB) for the Cincinnati Reds, St. Louis Cardinals, Boston Bees / Braves, Brooklyn Dodgers, Washington Senators, and St. Louis Browns between 1931 and 1945. His father, Gene Sr., was a pitcher for the Pirates and Reds between 1910 and 1912.

Career
In a 14-season career, Moore posted a .270 batting average with 58 home runs and 436 RBI in 1042 games played.

Best season
In , Moore played in 151 games for the Boston Bees, batting .290, with 185 hits, 38 doubles, 12 triples, and 91 runs scored – all career-highs. On May 1st, facing Pittsburgh's Waite Hoyt, Moore made Forbes Field history, becoming the first left-handed batter to launch a home run over that stadium's distant left-field wall, as well as the first to clear its then eleven-year-old, 24-foot-high scoreboard. (Scarcely one year later, he would become the first and only player to perform this feat twice.)

See also
 List of second-generation Major League Baseball players

Notes

References

External links

Gene Moore MLB Outfielder - Baseballbiography.com

National League All-Stars
Boston Bees players
Boston Braves players
Brooklyn Dodgers players
Cincinnati Reds players
St. Louis Browns players
St. Louis Cardinals players
Washington Senators (1901–1960) players
Major League Baseball right fielders
People from Lancaster, Texas
Baseball players from Texas
1909 births
1978 deaths
People from Jackson, Missouri
Midland Colts players
Dallas Steers players
Peoria Tractors players
Minneapolis Millers (baseball) players
Louisville Colonels (minor league) players
Elmira Red Wings players
Harrisburg Senators players
Houston Buffaloes players
Columbus Red Birds players
Rochester Red Wings players
Montreal Royals players